Encores is an album by pianist and bandleader Stan Kenton featuring performances recorded in 1945–47 and originally released on the Capitol label as three 78rpm discs, reissued as a 10-inch LP in 1950, and then as a 12-inch LP in 1955 with additional tracks.

Reception

The Allmusic review by Scott Yanow observed "None of the selections are considered classics but most (particularly "Painted Rhythm," "Capitol Punishment" and "Abstraction") should delight Kenton collectors".

Track listing
All compositions by Pete Rugolo and Stan Kenton except where noted.
 "Peg o' My Heart" (Alfred Bryan, Fred Fisher) – 3:36
 "He's Funny That Way" (Neil Moret, Richard A. Whiting) – 3:14
 "Capitol Punishment" – 4:32
 "Painted Rhythm" (Kenton) – 2:55 Additional track on 10-inch LP
 "Journey to Brazil" – 3:01 Additional track on 12-inch LP
 "Lover" (Richard Rodgers, Lorenz Hart) – 2:44 Additional track on 10-inch LP
 "Somnambulism" (Ken Hanna) – 3:09
 "Abstraction" – 3:08
 "Chorale for Brass, Piano and Bongo" – 3:05
 "Please Be Kind" (Saul Chaplin, Sammy Cahn) – 2:59 Additional track on 12-inch LP
 "Ecuador" (Gene Roland) – 2:42 Additional track on 12-inch LP

Note
Recorded at Radio Recorders in Hollywood, CA on October 30, 1945 (track 4), June 7, 1946 (tracks 1 & 2), July 18, 1946 (track 11), February 27, 1947 (track 3), March 31, 1947 (track 6), April 1, 1947 (track 10), September 24, 1947 (track 9), September 25, 1947 (track 8) and at RKO-Pathé Studios in New York City, NY on December 21, 1947 (track 5), December 22, 1947 (track 7)

Personnel
Stan Kenton – piano, arranger
Alfred "Chico" Alvarez (tracks 1–3 & 5–11), John Anderson (tracks 1–4, 6, 10 & 11), Russ Burgher (track 4), Buddy Childers, Ken Hanna (tracks 1–3 & 5–11), Bob Lymperis (track 4) Al Porcino (tracks 5 & 7–9), Ray Wetzel – trumpet
Milt Bernhart (tracks 3 & 5–10), Eddie Bert (tracks 5 & 7–9), Harry Betts (tracks 5 & 7–9), Harry Forbes (tracks 3 & 5–10), Skip Layton (tracks 3, 6 & 10), Milt Kabak (tracks 1, 2, 4 & 11), Jimmy Simms (track 4), Miff Sines (tracks 1, 2, 4 & 11), Kai Winding (tracks 1–3, 6 10 & 11), Freddie Zito (track 4) – trombone 
Bart Varsalona – bass trombone
Al Anthony (tracks 1, 2, 4 & 11), Boots Mussulli (tracks 1–4, 6, 10 & 11), Eddie Meyers (tracks 3, 6 & 10), Frank Pappalardo (tracks 8 & 9), Art Pepper (tracks 5 & 7), George Weidler (tracks 5 & 7–9) – alto saxophone 
Bob Cooper, Vido Musso (tracks 1–4 & 6, 10 & 11), Warner Weidler (tracks 5 & 7–9) – tenor saxophone
Bob Gioga – baritone saxophone
Pete Rugolo – piano (track 2)
Bob Ahern (tracks 1–4, 6, 10 & 11), Laurindo Almeida (tracks 5 & 7–9) – guitar 
Eddie Safranski – bass 
Ralph Collier (track 4), Shelly Manne (tracks 1–3 & 5–11) – drums
Jack Costanzo – bongos (tracks 5 & 7–9)
Carlos Vidal – congas (track 5) 
Frank "Machito" Grillo – maracas (track 5) 
June Christy – vocals (tracks 2 & 10)
Ken Hanna (track 7), Stan Kenton (track 4), Gene Roland (track 11), Pete Rugolo (tracks 1–3, 5, 6 & 8–10) – arranger

References

Stan Kenton albums
1949 albums
Capitol Records albums
Albums arranged by Pete Rugolo
Albums arranged by Stan Kenton
Albums arranged by Gene Roland